Rangataua was a station on the North Island Main Trunk line, in the Ruapehu District of New Zealand. Like most of the stations on the central part of the NIMT, a large timber trade exploited the native bush until it was largely felled. What is now the small village of Rangataua developed to the south of the station. Just a single track now passes through and virtually nothing remains of the once busy station and workshops.

History 

Surveying for the route between Hīhītahi and Piriaka began in 1894. Bush felling for the railway started in 1900. The rails were extended to the station on 31 May 1907 and a passenger train with dignitaries and reporters reached it in July. The line opened from Waiouru to Rangataua for goods traffic on 12 August 1907. A stationmaster was appointed in August 1907. There was mention of cars for passenger trains from Mataroa to Rangataua in September 1907.

During construction a small workshop was built at Rangataua in 1907 and 1908, with a plumber, carpenter, painter, store, and smithy. Further machinery was added in 1912 and a shed in 1928.

A 3rd class station was built by September 1909 for around £11,000, including workshops and housing for an inspector, a stationmaster and two platelayers. 5 railway cottages were built by 1908 and some were moved from Waiouru to Rangataua in 1909. The stationmaster got hot water in 1912, the others in 1915, and it was proposed to light the cottages with electricity in 1914. There was a tablet and fixed signals. A water tank was added in 1910. A crossing loop could take 60 wagons.

As timber traffic declined (see table below), so did the station. In 1934 Rangataua was converted to a tablet station which could be switched out. On 28 February 1959 it lost its stationmaster. Approval to remove the station building was given in 1971. On 19 September 1986 the station closed to all traffic.

Timber 
As shown in the table below, timber traffic reached a peak in 1913 and declined rapidly after 1930. There were several timber mills. Perham, Larson & Co had a tramway, with a Climax loco, from about 1909 (they had a tramway license in 1913) to 1944. Waiakaki Sawmilling Co had a tramway from around 1928 to 1933. In 1940 Marton Sash & Door Co were cutting the bush.

Powell Wood Process Ltd 
In 1908 a new sawmill and treatment works were built to produce Powellised timber, which was claimed to resist rot and insect damage. They had rights to fell  of rimu, matai, kahikatea, māpou, kāmahi and hard beech forest, The works were connected to that and the railway by a tramway, which extended some  towards Mount Ruapehu, the total cost being about £30,000; a 1910 photo showed a group on horses following a tramline on the way to the mountain. The works was expanded in 1909 and 1911, but a 1915 report cast doubt on the claims for the process and, after the works burnt down in the Raetihi Forest fire of 1918, the company went into liquidation. A 1930 report on wooden paving in Auckland noted how well the Powellised timber had lasted.

Patronage 
As shown in the table and graph below, like many NIMT stations, passenger numbers were highest during World War II, but then fell back to an average of around 25 a day. However, Rangataua ranked 3rd among NIMT stations in terms of the volume of its timber traffic by 1913. By 1910 it was sending out an average of 25 wagons a day. World War I labour shortages, the 1918 fire and conversion of land to grazing, then reduced timber traffic, but sheep numbers rose from 1,222 in 1913 to 12,662 in 1949.

References

External links 

Photos -

 1909 platform and tablet changer
 1909 station and town
 1912-16 horse tramway, sawmill tramway, train at Powell sawmill
 1924 express train passing through Rangataua
 1943 aerial view
 2010 Google Street View of station site

Railway stations in New Zealand
Rail transport in Manawatū-Whanganui
Buildings and structures in Manawatū-Whanganui
Railway stations opened in 1907
Railway stations closed in 1986
Ruapehu District